Elwood is a village in Will County, Illinois, United States. The population was 2,279 at the 2010 United States Census.

History
Elwood was founded in 1854, and incorporated as a village in 1869. The completion of the Joliet–Bloomington railroad played a major role in the founding of Elwood. By 1900, Elwood was a small farming community with a population of about 400. In the late 1930s, the federal government acquired nearby land for troop training and weapons production, on which site the Joliet Arsenal was built and commenced operation in 1940.  Arsenal construction played an important role in the development of Elwood and brought about 175 people into the area. In 1942, a massive explosion at the arsenal killed 42 workers and caused widespread damage. In 1954, the village celebrated its centennial, and 20,000 people gathered to watch the parade. By 1970, Elwood had a population of about 750.

On May 8, 1988, a tornado touched down about three miles (5 km) north of the village, uprooting large trees and heavily damaging a few homes and pole built buildings.

In 1990, the village began to experience more rapid growth. By 1996, Elwood's population rose to nearly 1,423, and is now estimated at 2,300, with development accelerating due to the construction of the CenterPoint Intermodal Center facility.  The Northern Illinois Planning Commission estimates that Elwood will have a population of nearly 20,000 by 2030.

The Midewin National Tallgrass Prairie, a prairie reserve operated by the United States Forest Service is located on the site of the former Joliet Army Ammunition Plant near Elwood, Illinois, and was established by federal law in 1996.  In 1999, the 982 acre (397 ha) Abraham Lincoln National Cemetery was dedicated in Elwood. When fully completed, it will provide 400,000 burial spaces.

Fires
Two major fires have taken place in Elwood, the first on August 26, 1995, in which the fire station was destroyed. The second, which occurred on May 5, 2008, completely destroyed Bill's Inn.  A residential fire in the Wyndstone Village subdivision on April 17, 2009 caused significant damage to some townhomes.

Geography
Elwood is located at  (41.413615, -88.110438). The nearest major highways are Interstate 80 to the north and Interstate 55 to the west. The former Route 66 highway passes through the village on the east side.

Demographics

As of the 2010 United States Census, there were 2,279 people, 880 households, and 630 families residing in the village. The racial makeup of the village was 94.9 percent White, 1.5 percent African American, 0.1 percent Native American, 0.5 percent Asian, 0.06 percent Pacific Islander, 2.2 percent from other races, and 0.8 percent from two or more races. Hispanics and Latinos of any race were 6.3 percent of the population.

There were 880 households, out of which 35.2 percent had children under the age of 18 living within, 58.3  percent were husband-wife family living together, 9.2 percent had a female householder with no husband present, and 28.4 percent were non-families. 24.1 percent of all households were made up of individuals, and 28.4 percent had someone living alone who was 65 years of age or older. The average household size was 2.59 and the average family size was 3.08.

In the village, the age distribution of the population shows 25.5 percent under the age of 18 and 15.4 percent who were 65 years of age or older. The median age was 37.8 years. 50.8 percent of the populations was female while 49.8 percent was male.

The median income for a household in the village was $78,515 USD, and the median income for a family was $83,698. Males had a median income of $68,500 versus $38,299 for females. The per capita income for the village was $30,223. About 6.5 percent of families and 8.5 percent of the population were below the poverty line, including 12.2 percent of those under age 18 and 8.2 percent of those age 65 or over.

References

External links
 Official website

Villages in Illinois
Villages in Will County, Illinois
Populated places established in 1854
1854 establishments in Illinois